Flora is a feminine given name of Latin origin meaning flower, ultimately derived from the Latin word flos, which had the genitive florus. Flora was a fertility goddess of flowers and springtime in Ancient Rome. 

Feminine variants include Florrie or its Scottish Gaelic equivalent Flòraidh. Flora was also used as an English translation for the etymologically unrelated Scottish Gaelic Fionnaghal, a variant of the Irish Gaelic name Fionnuala. 

Other feminine variants include the Dutch Floor and Floortje, the English and French Florence, the French Fleur, Flore, and Florette, the Hungarian Flóra, the Italian Fiore and Fiorenza, the Occitan Flòra, the Sami Florá, the Portuguese and Spanish Flor and Florinda, the Spanish Florencia, and the Portuguese Florência, and the Welsh Fflur.

Usage
The name came into regular use by the 1700s in countries across Europe and elsewhere. The name was among the one hundred most popular names for girls in the United States in the late 1800s and early 1900s and remained among the top one thousand names used for girls through 1972 and then declined. It has again risen in use in recent years and has been among the one thousand most used names for American girls since 2019. It is also in regular use in the United Kingdom, France, and Hungary.

Notable people
Flora A. Brewster (1852-1919), American physician, surgeon
Flora Bridges (1859–1912), American college professor
Flora Brovina (born 1949), Kosovar poet and pediatrician
Flora Carabella (1926–1999), Italian actress
Flora Chan (born 1970), Hong Kong actress
Flora Coquerel (born 1994), French model
Flora D. Darpino (born 1961), American judge advocate general
Flora Eldershaw (1897–1956), Australian writer
Flora Kaai Hayes (1893–1968), Hawaiian politician
Flora Karimova (born 1941), Azerbaijani singer 
Flora Haines Loughead (1855–1943), American writer, farmer, miner
Flora E. Lowry (1879–1933), American anthologist 
Flora MacDonald (1722–1790), Scottish Jacobite
Flora MacDonald (1926–2015), Canadian politician
Flora Mace (born 1949), American glass artist
Flora Martínez (born 1977), Colombian actress
Flora Martirosian (1957–2012), Armenian singer
Flora Montgomery (born 1974), British actress
Flora Murray (1869–1923), British doctor and suffragette
Flora Nwapa (1931–1993), Nigerian author 
Flora Purim (born 1942), Brazilian singer 
Flora Redoumi (born 1976), Greek hurdler
Flora Robson (1902–1984), British actress
Flora Madeline Shaw (1864–1927), Canadian nurse and nursing teacher
Flora Annie Steel (1847–1929), British writer 
Flora Stevenson (1839–1905), British educational reformer
Flora E. Strout (1867-1962), American teacher, social reformer
Flora Thompson (1876–1947), British writer
Flora Tristan (1803–1844), French writer and feminist
Flora Twort (1893–1985), British painter

Fiction
Flora, fictional character in the animated TV show Jayce and the Wheeled Warriors
Flora, is one of the three good fairies in the 1959 Disney animated film Sleeping Beauty
Dr. Flora, an ant and the colony's doctor in the 1998 Disney/Pixar animated film A Bug's Life
Flora, fictional character in the TV series Thomas and Friends
Flora, fictional character in the Italian television series Winx Club
Flora, nickname for the character Nera Briscoletti in the video game Dragon Quest V: Hand of the Heavenly Bride
Flora Baumbach, fictional character in the novel The Westing Game by Ellen Raskin
Flora Mejia, a character in the Netflix series  Grand Army
Flora Northrop, fictional character in the Main Street book series by Ann M. Martin
Flora Poste, fictional character of the novel Cold Comfort Farm by Stella Gibbons

Notes

See also
 Flora (surname)
 Flora (disambiguation)
 Flore (given name)
 Fleur (given name)
 Floortje
 Flower (name), a surname and given name
 Flowers (name), a surname
 Tzitzak, Khazar princess and Byzantine Empress whose name meant "flower"

Feminine given names
Given names derived from plants or flowers
Latin feminine given names